Year 559 was a common year starting on Wednesday (link will display the full calendar) of the Julian calendar. The denomination 559 for this year has been used since the early medieval period, when the Anno Domini calendar era became the prevalent method in Europe for naming years.

Events 
 By place 

 Byzantine Empire 
 Winter – The Kutrigurs and Huns under Zabergan cross the frozen Danube River, and invade the Balkans. They raid Thracia and Macedonia, but are driven back near Constantinople by a Byzantine force under Belisarius.
 Battle of Melantias: Outside the city walls of Constantinople, Belisarius defeats the combined "barbarians" with his veteran cavalry (bucellarii), and a few thousand hastily raised levies.

 Britain 
 Glappa succeeds his father Ida as king of Bernicia (North East England). During his rule, Anglian settlers expand their territory in what is now southeastern Scotland.

 Asia 
 First successful human flight: a kite carrying Yuan Huangtou lands in the proximity of Ye, China. Emperor Wen Xuan Di sponsors the flight; Yuan is taken prisoner; other imprisoned kite flyers also fly, but those die and Yuan survives. Yuan is executed afterwards. 
 Wen Di, age 37, succeeds his uncle Chen Wu Di as emperor of the Chen Dynasty. During his reign, he consolidates the state against the rebellious warlords.
 The city-state Ara Gaya, a member of the Gaya confederacy, surrenders to Silla in the Korean peninsula.
 Pyeongwon becomes ruler of the Korean kingdom of Goguryeo.

Births 
 Reccared I, king of the Visigoths (d. 601)
 Wu Shihuo, father of Wu Zetian (d. 635)
 Xuan Di, emperor of Northern Zhou (d. 580)

Deaths 
 Chen Wu Di, emperor of the Chen Dynasty (b. 503)
 Ida, king of Bernicia (approximate date)
 Leonard of Noblac, Frankish abbot and saint
 Wen Xuan Di, emperor of Northern Qi (b. 529)

References